The Goa Football Association First Division (First Division) is the second-highest state level football league in Goa, following the Goa Pro League. It is organised by the Goa Football Association. The champions of the First division get promoted to the GPL. The last place gets relegated to the Second division. It is contested by 14 clubs.

History
As of 2019, there are 14 clubs playing the league, with each team playing a total number of 13 matches. It is usually played from March to May.

2019 clubs

External links
 Goa Football Association website
 First Division Football News, Herald

References

Goa Football Website
First Division Scores
First Division League News

Football in Goa
4